The 1959–60 Scottish League Cup was the fourteenth season of Scotland's second football knockout competition. The competition was won by Heart of Midlothian for a second successive season, after they defeated Third Lanark 2–1 in the final. Hearts would later go on to become the only Scottish club outside the Old Firm to win a League and League Cup double.

First round

Group 1

Group 2

Group 3

Group 4

Group 5

Group 6

Group 7

Group 8

Group 9

Supplementary Round

First Leg

Second Leg

Quarter-finals

First Leg

Second Leg

Semi-finals

Final

References

General

Specific

League Cup
Scottish League Cup seasons